The Middle Creek Subdivision is a railroad line owned and operated by CSX Transportation in the U.S. state of Kentucky. It was formerly part of the Huntington West Division. It became part of the CSX Florence Division on June 20, 2016. CSX filed to abandon all but the first mile (2 km) at Prestonsburg in 2004; it had not seen traffic since the early 1990s. However, due to complications regarding possible rail banking and its effect on the Middle Creek National Battlefield, the line has not yet been abandoned . The line is now abandoned, and has been purchased by the city of Prestonsburg, Kentucky. The tracks are now gone and it is currently being converted into a trail.

References

CSX Transportation lines
Rail infrastructure in Kentucky
Chesapeake and Ohio Railway
Transportation in Floyd County, Kentucky
Closed railway lines in the United States